This is a list of defensive conventions used in the game of contract bridge to compete in the bidding after the opponents have opened with a one notrump (1NT) bid.

 ANTI
 Aspro
 Asptro, a hybrid of Astro and Aspro
 Astro, Modified Astro, Pinpoint Astro, Grano-Astro, Roth-Stone Astro
 Astrolite
 Becker
 Bergen over 1NT (see DONT)
 Blue Club transfers (see Transfer overcalls)
 Brozel
 Cansino, Modified Cansino
 Canape transfers
 Cappelletti, Modified Cappelletti, Revised Cappelletti
 CDH Buchanan
 CHASM
 Comfy Canapé or CoCa
 CRASH (aka CRO)
 Crowhurst convention
 DONT, Revised DONT
 Exclusion bids (aka Super Convention)
 Feathertson
 Feel Away Notrump (FAN)
 Feel Oriented Notrump Destroyer (FOND)
 Gates adjunct
 Grano-Astro (see Astro)
 Hamilton
 Hello
 Kelsey
 Landy
 Lionel
 Maestro Double
 Meckwell
 Meyerson
 Modified Astro (see Astro)
 Mohan
 MONK 
 Mylläri 
 Multi-Landy
 Nilsland
 Pinpoint Astro (see Astro)
 Pottage, Revised Pottage
 Power
 RCO
 Ripstra
 Roche convention
 Roth
 Roth-Stone Astro (see Astro)
 Sahara convention
 Scorrchio
 Sharples convention, Modified Sharples
 Soap convention
 Splash convention
 Suction, Twerb Suction, Suction Redwood
 Supernatural
 Tizi convention
 Toss convention
 Transfer overcalls
 TRASH
 Uni-club
 Vroom convention
 Modified Wallis
 Westwood convention See also WIND convention and WINDA
 WIND convention
 WINDA
 WONT
 Woolsey

References

Further reading
  217 pages.

External links
 Australian Bridge magazine, December 2000, pages 20-21. List of defenses against a 1NT opening (text corrupted, but does provide a listing). Official website
 Bridge Buff website: commentary on the MONK convention.
 Pattaya Bridge Club website: list of defenses against a 1NT opening are briefly reviewed, including a comparison of Cappelletti and Multi-Landy.
 Chris Ryall's website: 1NT defenses.
 David Stevenson's website: 1NT defenses.
 The 1NT Battlefield by Jon Gustafson
 BridgeGuys List of defenses against notrump openings. 
 ClaireBridge website: Défenses contre l’ouverture d’1 SA (in English)